Jules Léon Austaut (1844 – 1929) was a French entomologist who specialised in Lepidoptera.

Works
 1879. Lépidoptères nouveaux d'Algérie. Petites Nouvelles entomologiques,  2, p. 293
 1879-1885. Lépidoptères nouveaux d'Algérie. Le Naturaliste 7, pp. 141–142
 1885. Lépidoptères nouveaux d'Algérie. Le Naturaliste 1, pp. 85 (1879), 156, 212, 220-221, 237, 284 (1880); 2, pp. 359-360 (1883), 391-392 (1884) & 3, pp. 141-142 (1885)
 1895. Notice sur le Parnassius poeta Oberthür et sur une variété inédite de cette espèce (variété oberthuri) Austaut. Le Naturaliste 17, pp. 247–248
 1889. Les Parnassiens de la faune Paléarctique, Leipzig, Ernst Heyne, 223 pages, 32 coloured plates 
 1890. Notice sur Colias erschoffi et sur sa nouvelle variété tancrei (Austaut). Le Naturaliste 12, p. 94
 1891. Deux Parnassius nouveaux de l'Asie Centrale. Le Naturaliste 13, p. 180
 1891. Le Colias wiskotti Staudinger et ses diverses variétés. Le Naturaliste 13, pp. 98–99
 1895. Notice sur le Parnassius poeta Oberthür et sur une variété inédite de cette espèce (variété oberthuri) Austaut. Le Naturaliste 17, pp. 247–248
 1895. Note sur un Parnassien nouveau du Thibet. Le Naturaliste 17, p. 39
 1898. Lépidoptères nouveaux de l'Asie centrale et Orientale. Le Naturaliste 20, pp. 201–202
 1898. Notice sur les Parnassius jacquemontii Boisd., epaphus Oberth., mercurius Groum, poeta Oberth. et sur une espèce inédite du Thibet septentrional, Parnassius tsaidamensis Austaut. Le Naturaliste 20, pp. 104–106
 1899. Lepidoptères nouveaux de l'Asie. Le Naturaliste 21, pp. 284–285
 1900. Notice sur deux varietés inédites du Parnassius apollo. Parn. apollo Ober. inversa Austaut, Parn. apollo var. eiffelensis Austaut. Le Naturaliste 22, p. 142
 1905. Notice sur quelques Lépidoptères nouveaux.  Entomologische Zeitschrift 18, p. 143
 1906. Notice sur quelques espèces nouvelles ou peu connues du genre Parnassius. Entomologische Zeitschrift, 20, pp. 66–68
 1910. Notice sur quelques Parnassius nouveaux. Entomologische Zeitschrift 24, pp. 55–56
 1911. Lépidoptères nouveaux. Entomologische Zeitschrift 24, pp. 224–225
 1911. Lépidoptères asiatiques nouveaux. Entomologische Zeitschrift 24, pp. 242–244
 1912. Notice sur quelques formes aberrantes de Parnassius. Internationale Entomologische Zeitschrift 5, pp. 359–361
 1912. Lépidoptères asiatiques nouveaux. Internationale Entomologische Zeitschrift 6, pp. 87–89

Sources
 Lhoste, J., 1987 Les Entomologistes francais 1750 - 1950. INRA, OPIE (Entomology): 115 [A1036].

External links
BHL Les Parnassiens de la faune paléarctique Leipzig, E. Heyne,1889. 3, pp. 141–142 (1885)
 1895. Notice sur le Parnassius poeta Oberthür et sur une variété inédite de cette espèce (variété oberthuri) Austaut. Le Naturaliste 17, pp. 247–248
 1889. Les Parnassiens de la faune Paléarctique, Leipzig, Ernst Heyne, 223 pages, 32 coloured plates 
 1890. Notice sur Colias erschoffi et sur sa nouvelle variété tancrei (Austaut). Le Naturaliste 12, p. 94
 1891. Deux Parnassius nouveaux de l'Asie Centrale. Le Naturaliste 13, p. 180
 1891. Le Colias wiskotti Staudinger et ses diverses variétés. Le Naturaliste 13, pp. 98–99
 1895. Notice sur le Parnassius poeta Oberthür et sur une variété inédite de cette espèce (variété oberthuri) Austaut. Le Naturaliste 17, pp. 247–248
 1895. Note sur un Parnassien nouveau du Thibet. Le Naturaliste 17, p. 39
 1898. Lépidoptères nouveaux de l'Asie centrale et Orientale. Le Naturaliste 20, pp. 201–202
 1898. Notice sur les Parnassius jacquemontii Boisd., epaphus Oberth., mercurius Groum, poeta Oberth. et sur une espèce inédite du Thibet septentrional, Parnassius tsaidamensis Austaut. Le Naturaliste 20, pp. 104–106
 1899. Lepidoptères nouveaux de l'Asie. Le Naturaliste 21, pp. 284–285
 1900. Notice sur deux varietés inédites du Parnassius apollo. Parn. apollo Ober. inversa Austaut, Parn. apollo var. eiffelensis Austaut. Le Naturaliste 22, p. 142
 1905. Notice sur quelques Lépidoptères nouveaux.  Entomologische Zeitschrift 18, p. 143
 1906. Notice sur quelques espèces nouvelles ou peu connues du genre Parnassius. Entomologische Zeitschrift, 20, pp. 66–68
 1910. Notice sur quelques Parnassius nouveaux. Entomologische Zeitschrift 24, pp. 55–56
 1911. Lépidoptères nouveaux. Entomologische Zeitschrift 24, pp. 224–225
 1911. Lépidoptères asiatiques nouveaux. Entomologische Zeitschrift 24, pp. 242–244
 1912. Notice sur quelques formes aberrantes de Parnassius. Internationale Entomologische Zeitschrift 5, pp. 359–361
 1912. Lépidoptères asiatiques nouveaux. Internationale Entomologische Zeitschrift 6, pp. 87–89

Sources
 Lhoste, J., 1987 Les Entomologistes francais 1750 - 1950. INRA, OPIE (Entomology): 115 [A1036].

External links
BHL Les Parnassiens de la faune paléarctique Leipzig, E. Heyne,1889.

French lepidopterists
1844 births
1929 deaths
Date of birth missing
Date of death missing
19th-century French zoologists
20th-century French zoologists